Mudanya Armistice House is a museum in Mudanya, Turkey. The museum is in the house where the treaty that acknowledged the Republic of Turkey was signed.

Location and history
The two-storey stone museum is in Mudanya ilçe (district) of Bursa Province. It is on Oniki Eylül street running along the Marmara sea side. The house was built in the 19th century by a Russian merchant named Aleksandr Ganyanof, and then it was purchased by contractor Hayri İpar. It has 13 rooms and two large halls. In 1936, after a period of restoration, İpar donated the house to be used as a museum, and the next year, the museum opened to the public.

Notability
The house is where the Armistice of Mudanya was signed after the Turkish War of Independence on 11 October 1922. By this treaty the Republic of Turkey was internationally acknowledged. During the talks, the Turkish side was represented by a delegation headed by İsmet İnönü (the president of Turkey from 1938–1950).

The exhibits
The ground floor contains rooms of the signatories (Allies of World War I and Turkey). The upper floor is the living quarters of the Turkish delegation (İsmet İnönü, Asım Gündüz and others). One notable item is the marble table which was broken by İsmet İnönü when he struck the table during a heated discussion.

References

External links
Virtual tour 

Museums in Bursa Province
1922 in the Ottoman Empire
History museums in Turkey
Mudanya
1937 establishments in Turkey
Tourist attractions in Bursa Province
Museums established in 1937